The Milwaukee Community Sailing Center is a private, non-profit 501(c)(3) agency.  The Sailing Center provides educational and recreational sailing programs to those who wish to gain access to Lake Michigan and learn to sail; regardless of age, ability, or financial concerns.  In 2004, MCSC celebrated its 25th year of sailing.

Much like a co-operative, the Sailing Center owns and maintains over 80 boats and provides members no-charge access to the fleet after they successfully demonstrate basic sailing skills and earn a rating.  Membership is low cost, less than the cost of insurance on a privately owned sailboat, and works on a sliding scale based on age, experience and income.  The Sailing Center also offers private boat owners 24-hour access to the lake, year-round boat and dinghy storage, mast stepping boat launching and haul out services.

Each summer the Sailing Center partners with local organizations to provide sailing opportunities to thousands of at-risk and economically disadvantaged youth, the physically challenged and others.  The Sailing Center also provides social activities and volunteer opportunities to members.

Mission

The Milwaukee Community Sailing Center is a private, non-profit agency that works to strengthen the sport of sailing through an active educational program and on-the-water sailing in a professional and safe manner.  The Milwaukee Community Sailing Center strives to be the organization of choice for people who wish to sail, for both the enjoyment and thrill of competition.

Location/Sailing Area

The Milwaukee Community Sailing Center is located north of downtown in the heart of Veterans Park at McKinley Marina.  The sailing area crosses the McKinley Mooring Basin as Light and Medium Air sailors remain inside the breakwater.  Heavy air sailors may sail outside the breakwater; however, before leaving the docks, sailors must develop a sailing plan based on the wind direction, keeping the safest and shortest route in mind.

Fleet/Facilities

The fleet at the Milwaukee Community Sailing Center makes up one of the largest of any community sailing program in the country.  The fleet of 80 boats includes  Pearson Ensign, J-24s, and Solings.  For younger sailors, the Sailing Center's fleet includes Hunter 146s, DC Dinghys and 470s, a two-person Olympic racer.  The Sailing Center uses a JY Club Trainer for use in area park lagoons.

History

Founded in 1977, the Milwaukee Community Sailing Center was created by a group of local sailors who sought to form a community organization to make sailing accessible to all in the Milwaukee area and dispel the myth that sailing is an elitist sport.  With seed money from Ted Seaver, Doug Drake and Milwaukee County offices and a maintenance facility were built.  Completed in 1980, and the Sailing Center opened with lessons and boat rentals.  With an enthusiastic staff of 10 and a humble fleet of Tech Dinghies, Volants and a safety boat, Milwaukee had a unique way to take advantage of the lake.

After the Sailing Center’s first year, twelve students graduated from the courses provided and the Sailing Center began to grow.  Today, hundreds of new members are learning to sail through Sailing Center programs. The nationally renowned "Prams in the Park" program began in 1985 and continues to bring sailing and water safety to Milwaukee County Park lagoons, offering scholarships to economically disadvantaged youth and giving individuals the opportunity to participate, learn and have fun.

The Sailing Center’s education and recreational programs have seen success as well.  The Sailing Center offers adult and youth members a full range of basic, intermediate and advanced sailing courses, as well as regattas, volunteer instructor opportunities and open sailing seven days a week on a variety if sailboats.

The Sailing Center now owns and maintains over 80 boats, one of the largest such fleets of any non-profit sailing organization in the U.S., including specifically designed Access Dinghies for physically challenged sailors.  With four full-time, year-round staff, which expands to 40 during the sailing season, and a strong base of 700+ members, the Sailing Center provides great times and wonderful outings for all who want to enjoy the sport of sailing in the City of Milwaukee.

Timeline

1977 - Milwaukee Community Sailing Center officially launched.  A group of dedicated volunteers file documents forming a governing board to create and manage the Sailing Center.
1979 - The Milwaukee County Board of Supervisors approves the plan for the Sailing Center office and maintenance facility and announces that it will be part of the overall McKinley Marina development.
1980 - Bill Mosher hired as the first executive director to oversee the development of brick and mortar construction, sailing instruction and programming.  10 Vanguard Volants were also purchased to form the nucleus of the fleet.  Vanguard Boatworks in Pewaukee built an  centerboard for the Sailing Center which is the ideal teaching boat of the Sailing Center’s fleet.  This was the first season that the Sailing Center was opened.
1981 & 1983 - In 1981, the first 12 students graduated from the beginning sailing course offered by the Sailing Center and in 1983 the Sailing Center hosted the prestigious National Finn Gold Cup Regatta.
1984 - The Sailing Center received Federal funding for "Prams in the Park," an innovative program to teach children ages 8–12 in local neighborhood parks how to sail.  The program connected the Sailing Center with the central city.
1988 - Board President Bill Ihlenfeld solicits donations of Ensigns, a 22’ keel boat, from owners across the country.  Today, the Sailing Center uses the Ensign boat as its primary teaching boat and boasts the largest fleet of this stable, roomy boat in the country.
1990 - "Sailing is Fun Day" is created to bring multiple organizations to the Sailing Center for a special day with volunteers offering physically challenged sailors boat rides followed by a picnic.
1995 - With more programs opening up through the Sailing Center, the first Sailor’s Ball was introduced to raise funds to support the Sailing Center’s programs.  Olympic and America’s Cup Sailor Buddy Melges was honored.  Approximately $175,000 has been raised over the last 9 years.
2000 - The Sailing Center’s board of directors recognizes a need to expand to provide for Sailing Center’s programs.  Authorizes building committee to begin strategic planning for the next 25 years.
2002 - $50,000 donated from an anonymous foundation funds program for at-risk kids.  The Harley–Davidson Foundation funded an additional $10,000 for this important youth initiative allowing the Sailing Center to partner with key inner-city organizations.  A campaign is set to raise $3 million for a new facility. Peter and Olaf Harken announce their $100,000 donation to the building fund at the annual Sailor’s Ball held March 2.  The Harkens also agreed to serve as co-chairs of the building campaign.  The board of directors and staff pledge $30,000 and the Sailing Center receives an additional pledge of $50,000 by an anonymous donor.
2010 - Fundraising and construction comes to a successful close, and the Milwaukee Community Sailing Center opens a new headquarters and training center, with a large community room, year-around classrooms, offices, bathrooms and an outdoor patio. The $2.25M  building is heated and cooled using a geothermal system to keep operating expenses low. The building is nominated for and receives the City of Milwaukee's Mayor's Design Award.

Membership

Members of the Milwaukee Community Sailing are able to participate in all programs the Sailing Center has to offer.  Upon completion of appropriate courses and after successfully demonstrating basic sailing skills, individuals have no-charge access to the fleet during Open Sailing.  Members are allowed to bring guests to sail and are able to participate in the Sailing Center’s racing program.  Members participate in social events, take advantage of the Sailing Center’s grounds, which provide volleyball courts and a picnic area, meet new people and have a great time, which is what being a member of the Sailing Center is all about.  For adults and youth, the Sailing Center offers three course levels; Basic, Intermediate and Advanced.

Outreach Programs

The Milwaukee Community Sailing Center has a variety of outreach programs that provide access to Lake Michigan through sailing and water safety training.  Through coordinated efforts with many community service organizations, the Sailing Center is able to provide experiences to many individuals. The following are programs that the Sailing Center has put together to provide services for the needs of those interested in the joys and benefits of sailing.

External links
Official website

References

The Business Journal of Milwaukee, Friday, October 1, 2004 "Sailing center needs financial wind for new building" by Mark Sabljak
The Business Journal of Milwaukee, Friday, March 22, 2002. "Sailing Center sets lakefront upgrade"  by Pete Millard
MKE, Aug. 3, 2006. "When I was 30 – Holly Davenport – Reaching a high-water mark." By Tim Cigelske
[Milwaukee Journal Sentinel, August 3, 2004, by Laura Steele. "Sailing center commits to making water truly open"]
Milwaukee Journal Sentinel, Sept. 8, 2006, by Vikki Ortiz. "Instructor was sailing before she could walk"

Buildings and structures in Milwaukee
Education in Milwaukee
Organizations established in 1979
Sailing centers in the United States
Sailing in Milwaukee
1979 establishments in Wisconsin